The 1970–71 Serie A season was won by Internazionale.

Teams
Varese, Foggia and Catania had been promoted from Serie B.

Final classification

Results

Top goalscorers

References and sources
Almanacco Illustrato del Calcio - La Storia 1898-2004, Panini Edizioni, Modena, September 2005

External links
  - All results on RSSSF Website.

1970-71
Italy
1